Peterborough and its surrounding area is and has been home to many notable people, especially considering its relatively small size. It has been especially prolific in producing players for the NHL through the Peterborough Petes. It also has produced a number of musicians, actors and authors.

Actors
Matt Frewer, known for playing Max Headroom
Ben Hollingsworth
Barclay Hope
William Hope
Linda Kash
David Kaye, voice actor
 Gordon Sackville, silent film actor
Estella Warren, former synchronized swimmer; model and actress

Athletes

Jennifer Essex  , former Dancer with the Winnipeg contemporary dancers

Les Ascott, (d. 2013) former CFL player with the Toronto Argonauts
Zac Bierk, former professional hockey player and brother of Sebastian Bach
Scotty Bowman, former hockey coach, Detroit Red Wings, Montreal Canadiens
Steve Chiasson, (1967–1999) National Hockey League player
John Druce, former NHL player with Washington Capitals, Winnipeg Jets, Los Angeles Kings and Philadelphia Flyers
Vince Dunn, NHL player with the Seattle Kraken
Bob Errey Former NHL Player/Current Broadcaster with the Pittsburgh Penguins
Shawn Evans, NLL player with the Buffalo Bandits
Mike Fisher, former NHL player with the Nashville Predators; husband of Carrie Underwood
Carl Fitzgerald, CFL player with the Saskatchewan Roughriders
Bob Gainey, former NHL player and now General Manager with the Montreal Canadiens
Rex Harrington, ballet dancer
Barrett Hayton, NHL player with the Arizona Coyotes
Mike Keenan, former NHL coach with the Calgary Flames
Tracey Kelusky, lacrosse player
Steve Larmer, former NHL player with the Chicago Blackhawks and New York Rangers
Johnny Mark, former CFL player
Rick McCrank, professional skateboarder
Greg Millen, hockey analyst, goaltender for the NHL
Roger Neilson, (1934–2003) innovative NHL coach who spent ten  years coaching the Peterborough Petes
Corey Perry, NHL player with the Tampa Bay Lightning, Stanley Cup winner (2007), Olympic Gold Medalist (2010)
Bobby Roode, professional wrestler working for WWE
Marc Savard, professional hockey player
Brad Sinopoli, CFL player with the Ottawa Redblacks
Mitchell Stephens, NHL player
Cory Stillman, former NHL player
Owen Tippett, NHL player
Chris White, lacrosse player
Jesse Young, professional basketball player with MMT Estudiantes in the Spanish Liga ACB

Musicians
Greg Wells, Grammy winning record producer, musician and songwriter
Tebey, country singer, pop
Adam Gontier, singer, songwriter and guitarist of Saint Asonia and prior lead singer of Three Days Grace
Emily Haines, musician, lead singer of Metric
Ronnie Hawkins, rock musician, currently resides in Lakefield (Peterborough County)
Ramin Karimloo, singer, songwriter, West End/Broadway performer
Trevor McNevan, lead singer of rock band Thousand Foot Krutch
Luke Nicholson, singer, songwriter
Serena Ryder, singer and songwriter
Neil Sanderson, drummer of Three Days Grace
Christian Tanna, brother of Jagori Tanna; co-founder of the band I Mother Earth
Jagori Tanna, brother of Christian Tanna; co-founder of the band I Mother Earth
Rob Wells, songwriter and record producer
Royal Wood, singer, songwriter

Politicians
George Albertus Cox (1840–1914), former mayor, Canadian Senator
Dean Del Mastro
Gerard Kennedy, 2006 Liberal leadership candidate, studied at Trent University
Peter Robinson (1785–1838),  Lieutenant-Governor of Ontario
Robert Smeaton White (1856-1944), Canadian Journalist and Member of Parliament

Religion
Alden John Bell, Roman Catholic bishop

Writers
Dave Carley, playwright
Robertson Davies, (1913–1995), novelist, playwright, critic, journalist and professor
Manly Palmer Hall, philosopher and mystical author
Hugh Kenner, scholar of modernist literature
Yann Martel, winner of the Booker Prize, studied philosophy at Peterborough's Trent University
Paul Nicholas Mason, author of The Night Drummer, Battered Soles, The Red Dress and A Pug Called Poppy
Derek McCormack, writer
Leah McLaren, journalist, author
Susanna Moodie, 19th-century author
Ian Rogers, horror writer
Catherine Parr Traill, 19th-century author

Other
Seán Cullen (born 1965), comedian, radio personality
Peter Demos (1918-2012), MIT physicist, former director of Bates Linear Accelerator
Kathryn Durst, artist and illustrator
Joseph Flavelle (1858–1939), businessman, Baron
Jeffrey Karp (born 1976), bioengineering researcher, Harvard professor
Trevor Kincaid (1872–1970), zoologist at the University of Washington
John D. Lowry (1932-2012), film restoration expert
Dan O'Toole (born 1975), TSN SportsCentre anchor
Peter Woodcock (1939-2010), serial killer

References

 
Peterborough
Peterborough